Chelyadnins (Челяднины) was an old Russian boyar family of Radsha and St Varlaam lineage via Akinfovs (Акинфовы), extinct in the 16th century.

Notable Chelyadnins 

Boyar Andrey Fyodorovich Chelyadnin  (?-1503), the first of Chelyadnins who gained the title of konyushy, governor (наместник, namestnik) of Novgorod. He was Commander-in-Chief during the Russo-Swedish War (1495–1497). In 1500 he defeated the Lithuanians at the Lovat River and captured the city of Toropets.

Boyar Ivan Andreyevich Chelyadnin (?-1514), konyushy at the court of Vasili III of Russia, voyevoda (1508–1509). He took part in a number of battles with the Grand Duchy of Lithuania, after the defeat of Russia at the Battle of Orsha he was taken into captivity and died in a prison in Vilnius.

Russian noble families